Diksha Basu is an American writer and actress. She is the author of the critically acclaimed novel The Windfall which is under adaptation for a television series by Shonali Bose.

Biography 
Diksha Basu was born in Delhi, to the sociologist Alaka Malwade Basu and economist Kaushik Basu, who later became the Chief Economic Advisor to the Government of India and then the Chief Economist at the World Bank. She grew up in Delhi during the 1990s till the age of 10. She moved to Ithaca, New York in 1994, as a teenager with her family. Basu states that after moving to upstate New York, she would keep visiting Delhi every 4 to 6 months. She eventually graduated from Cornell University with a Bachelor of Arts in economics, and in the French language as part of a double major.

In 2008, she moved to Mumbai to pursue a career in acting, and lived in the city for four years. She featured in the comedy series Mumbai Calling (2007) and in the drama film A Decent Arrangement (2011). Basu states that she became frustrated with her acting career and began writing as an escape after spending two years in the Bollywood industry. Her debut novel Opening Night was published by HarperCollins and launched in 2012 by Chetan Bhagat. The novel depicted the struggles of an American-born actor who moved to Mumbai to pursue a career in acting. It was described as a deeply personalised non autobiographical work of literary fiction.

Basu joined the Columbia University School of the Arts to attain a Master of Fine Arts in creative writing, from where she graduated in 2014. She also featured in the memory film A Million Rivers (2017). In the meantime, she married the music producer Mikey McCleary and gave birth to her daughter in 2017. Her second novel The Windfall was also published and launched in the same year, it was a humorous fiction marketed as a debut novel and depicted the life of a middle class Indian man who had suddenly encountered wealth. It received positive critical acclaim and was signed in for a deal to be adapted into a television series. According to ELLE magazine, it broke stereotypes of exoticism surrounding India while according to The Wire, it was a "shrewd and unstintingly funny story about the neuroses of New Delhi's 1%". The Hindu gave it a mixed review objecting at its lack of nuance and inaccuracies in social and cultural depictions.

In 2020, she published her third novel, Destination Wedding. It is a humorous take on a modern Indian wedding with characters who travel from New York to attend the ceremony. The family at the center of the novel is wealthy and has American sensibilities that are often at odds with traditional Indian customs. This causes them to question their identity and belonging to both cultures. The novel has received a ton of praise. Actress and model Chrissy Teigen even said that she was "extremely obsessed with this book."

Books 

 Opening Night (2012)
 The Windfall (2017)
 Destination Wedding (2020)

Filmography

References

External links
 

Living people
Women writers from Delhi
Actresses from Delhi
Writers from Ithaca, New York
Indian emigrants to the United States
American women writers of Indian descent
American actresses of Indian descent
Cornell University alumni
Columbia University School of the Arts alumni
American expatriate actresses in India
American film actresses
American television actresses
Actresses in Hindi cinema
Actresses in Hindi television
Year of birth missing (living people)
21st-century American women writers
21st-century American actresses